Jacob Minah (born 3 April 1982) is a decathlete from Germany. He set his personal best in the event (8099 points) on 13 August 2007 at the 2007 Summer Universiade in Bangkok, Thailand, earning him the gold medal. He is a nephew of former vice-president of Sierra Leone, Francis Minah.

Achievements

References
trackfield.brinkster

1982 births
Living people
German decathletes
Universiade medalists in athletics (track and field)
Universiade gold medalists for Germany
Medalists at the 2007 Summer Universiade